Thereuopodina queenslandica is a species of centipede in the Scutigeridae family. It is endemic to Australia. It was first described in 1925 by German myriapodologist Karl Wilhelm Verhoeff.

Subspecies
 Thereuopodina queenslandica queenslandica Verhoeff, 1925
 Thereuopodina queenslandica simplex Verhoeff, 1925

Distribution
The species occurs in north-eastern Queensland. The type locality of T. q. queenslandica is Cedar Creek (now Ravenshoe); that of T. q. simplex is Malanda; both of which lie on the Atherton Tableland of Far North Queensland.

Behaviour
The centipedes are solitary terrestrial predators that inhabit plant litter and soil.

References

 

 
queenslandica
Centipedes of Australia
Endemic fauna of Australia
Fauna of Queensland
Animals described in 1925
Taxa named by Karl Wilhelm Verhoeff